Angola Air Charter is a charter airline based in Luanda, Angola. It operates cargo charters in Africa. Its main base is Quatro de Fevereiro Airport, Luanda.

History 

The airline was established in 1987 and is wholly owned by TAAG Angola Airlines.

Fleet 

The Angola Air Charter fleet consists of the following aircraft :

1 Embraer EMB-120RT Brasilia

Previously operated
Angola Air Charter has also operated:

7 Boeing 707
1 707-321C
2 707-324C
1 707-347C
2 707-351C
1 707-373C
10 Boeing 727
1 727-21
1 727-22C
2 727-23
1 727-23F
1 727-44
1 727-51C
1 727-77(C)
1 727-116(C)
1 727-151(C)
1 Boeing 737-200
7 Lockheed Hercules
1 L-100-20 Hercules
6 L-100-30 Hercules
3 Antonov An-12
1 AN-12
2 AN-12BP
1 Embraer EMB-120RT Brasilia
1 Ilyushin IL-76

References

External links

Airlines banned in the European Union
Airlines established in 1987
Airlines of Angola
Cargo airlines
Charter airlines
1987 establishments in Angola